Bhimajuli massacre of 2009 was named after Bhimajuli, a village in Assam, India, where NDFB militants of its anti-talks faction led by Ranjan Daimary fired indiscriminately at villagers in Bhimajuli, in Sonitpur district near the Assam-Arunachal border  killing five people on the spot and six later, including an eight-year-old girl on October 4, 2009.

Protests broke out soon after and angry residents came out of their houses with bows and arrows in their hands. They also did not allow CRPF jawans to enter their village. The outraged villagers accused the government of failing to maintain law and order.

Different organisations such as the All Assam Gorkha Student Union, All Assam Students Union, All Assam President of Asom Xatra Mahaxabha Bhadra Krishna Goswami condemned the killings at Bhimajuli in a press meet.

See also
 Assam conflict

External links
 Bhimajuli burning with simmering tension 
 AAGSU torch rally in memorium of Bhimajuli massacre 
 Bhimajuli Carnage: A Year Later, Palpable Grief at Ground Zero  
 Rebels Without a Cause  
 Assam armed groups: Revolution gone, terrorism on 
 BHIMAJULI MASSACRE AND THE RESPONSE OF THE GOVERNMENT

References

Massacres in 2009
October 2009 crimes
October 2009 events in India
Massacres in India
2000s in Assam
Crime in Assam
Sonitpur district
Mass shootings in India
2009 mass shootings in Asia
2009 murders in India